Mill Creek is a tributary of the Mohawk River in Lane County in the U.S. state of Oregon. It begins in the foothills of the Cascade Range northeast of Springfield and flows generally west through Wendling to meet the river near Marcola. The confluence is about 13 river miles (21 km) from the Mohawk's mouth on the McKenzie River. Mill Creek's named tributaries from source to mouth are Straight, Nebo, Deer, Oshkosh, and Wolf creeks.

A  covered bridge called Wendling Bridge carries Wendling Road over Mill Creek in Wendling. Built in 1938, the bridge was added to the National Register of Historic Places in 1979.

See also
List of rivers of Oregon

References

External links
McKenzie Watershed Council

Rivers of Oregon
Rivers of Lane County, Oregon